Columbia Elementary School District, located in Redding, California, is a school district on Redding's far east side. It is home to one elementary school and one middle school.

Administrative Team
Clayton Ross is the superintendent and also the principal of the elementary school. Ross has been the superintendent since January 2011 and the principal since January 2007.
The middle school principalship is currently Shannon Angstadt. 

Columbia Elementary School
Mountain View Middle School

References

External links
 

Redding, California
School districts in Shasta County, California